Klasa B represents the eighth level of the Polish football hierarchy. Teams promoted from Klasa B move up to Klasa A, whilst relegated teams descend to the Klasa C leagues (where the latter league exists).

Notes

References

External links
 Ligi regionalne 2020–21 

8